is a beach volleyball player from Japan. She won the silver medal in the women's team competition at the 2006 Asian Games in Doha, partnering compatriot Shinako Tanaka. In the final the couple lost (1-2) to the Chinese pair Xue Chen and Zhang Xi.

Playing partners
Shinako Tanaka
Rii Seike
Kanako Nishimura
Ayako Inoue

References
 

1973 births
Living people
Japanese beach volleyball players
Asian Games medalists in beach volleyball
Beach volleyball players at the 2006 Asian Games
Women's beach volleyball players
Asian Games silver medalists for Japan
Medalists at the 2006 Asian Games